= Pooja Sharma Rekha =

Indian transgender role model

- Born: Kolkata, India
- Occupation: Influencer
- Known for: She looks like Bollywood actress Rekha in her style

Pooja Sharma Rekha also referred to as "Junior Rekha" due to her resemblance to Bollywood actress Rekha in both style and appearance, is an Indian influencer.

After relocating to Mumbai, Pooja initially explored different ways to support herself, including seeking alms. However, she later found her calling entertaining passengers on local trains with her dancing skills and blessings, earning the affectionate nickname "Junior Rekha".

Despite her rising fame, Pooja faced societal prejudice and a lack of acceptance, enduring ridicule and derogatory remarks.
